"Yesterday Never Comes" is an episode of the BBC sit-com, Only Fools and Horses. It was the fourth episode of series 3, and was first broadcast on 1 December 1983. In the episode, Del goes out with an antiques dealer, but she is more interested in a painting he owns.

Synopsis
Del Boy enters the world of fine art when he develops a crush on a "posh tart" antique dealer named Miranda Davenport. He tries to sell her a very old cabinet which is described as a "Queen Anne" original, but the word "Fyffes" can be clearly seen, and it has woodworm. But, she finds out about a painting - a valuable work by 19th-century painter Joshua Blythe - that Del has on the wall in the lounge, but seemingly does not realise the true value of. Miranda soon charms her way into Del's good books and gets the painting as a birthday gift.

Thinking that he is in love, Del heads to Miranda's shop, which is closed due to an infestation of woodworm, and is informed that she has gone to the local auction house.

Del arrives at the auction house, only to find out that Miranda had pretended to like him in order to get the painting to put up for auction and make a good profit, and has registered the painting in her name as well as had her parents sign an affidavit to state that it has been in her family for generations. Del's reaction to this is relief, and tells Miranda that he has been trying to get rid of it for years. It emerges that he knew full well who painted the picture and that it was worth thousands. Miranda enquires how he would know, and Del tells her that his grandmother worked as a cleaning lady to an art dealer and stole the painting. As the painting is bought, Del wishes Miranda luck and leaves her to an ominous fate just as two men begin to inspect the painting's legitimacy.

Episode cast

Episode concept
The idea for the script is based on John Sullivan's friend's mother, who was a charlady at an art gallery.

Notes

References

External links

1983 British television episodes
Only Fools and Horses (series 3) episodes